The State Register of Heritage Places is maintained by the Heritage Council of Western Australia. , 131 places are heritage-listed in the Shire of Gingin, of which 13 are on the State Register of Heritage Places.

List
The Western Australian State Register of Heritage Places, lists the following 13 state registered places within the Shire of Gingin:

Notes

 No coordinates specified by Inherit database

References

Gingin
Gingin
Shire of Gingin